The Node community, also known as Nodi or Nodhi, is a Muslim community primarily found in the state of Gujarat in India and the province of Sindh in Pakistan. They are one of several pastoral nomadic communities inhabiting the Banni region of Kutch.

Origins and distribution 

Prior to their settlement in Kutch, the Node community spent some time in Sindh, and a few members of the community still live there. Unlike other communities of pastoral nomads in the Banni region of Kutch, the Node do not claim Rajput ancestry. They are primarily found in Kutch District, with some also residing in the Jamnagar District of Saurashtra.

Language and social structure 

The Node community speaks a dialect of Kutchi with significant Sindhi loanwords. They are an endogamous community and tend to marry within their own community, although intermarriage with other Samma communities, such as the Sameja, is not uncommon. The Node community is divided into a number of clans, with the main ones including the Palli, Uttal, Moora, Rav, Arbab, Deshar, Saad, Hola, Amar, Bavu, Visa, Dora, Jaras, Borath, Bhooth, Bambia, Numria, and Otha. While they do not practice clan exogamy, each clan is of equal status, and intermarriage between clans is permitted.

Economic activities 
The Node community is primarily engaged in Maldhari cattle breeding, a traditional occupation of many communities in the Banni region of Kutch. In addition to cattle breeding, the Node are also cultivators and landless agricultural laborers. Like many Kutchi communities, a significant number of Node community members have migrated to other parts of India in search of employment opportunities.

The Node Jamat 
Like many Gujarati Muslims, the Node community has a caste association known as the Node Jamat, which is responsible for the welfare of the community.

References

Social groups of Gujarat
Tribes of Kutch
Maldhari communities
Muslim communities of India
Sindhi tribes

Muslim communities of Gujarat
Sindhi tribes in India